Limavady Castle (Léim an Mhadaidh), also known as O'Cahans Castle, is a ruined castle in County Londonderry, Northern Ireland. It was once a stronghold of the O'Cahans.

In 1542, the  MacQuillans, accompanied by James Butler, 9th Earl of Ormond, the Lord High Treasurer of Ireland and a large body of English, besieged and took the castle, slaughtering the whole garrison.

Citations

External links
http://ads.ahds.ac.uk/catalogue/search/fr.cfm?rcn=NISMR-LDY016:003

Castles in County Londonderry
Ruined castles in Northern Ireland